Chi-won is a Korean male given name.

People with this name include:
Choe Chiwon (fl. 857–924), Korean Silla Dynasty philosopher and poet
Chi-Won Yoon (born 1959), South Korean financier and executive

See also
List of Korean given names

Korean masculine given names